Slave Ambient is the second studio album by American indie rock band The War on Drugs, released on August 16, 2011, on Secretly Canadian. Recorded over three years, Slave Ambient is the final release to feature contributions from founding guitarist Kurt Vile and drummer Mike Zanghi, and the first to feature drummer Steven Urgo.

The album was preceded by the EP, Future Weather, in 2010.

Background and recording
Regarding his recording contributions to Slave Ambient former guitarist Kurt Vile stated, "I was stoked to play on those songs ["Best Night" and "It's Your Destiny"], but I was more involved in the early days. Obviously the first record I was very involved in."

Artwork
Slave Ambient'''s artwork features photography by founding member Adam Granduciel. Its cover photograph was taken in Zaragoza, Spain, in July 2009, whilst on tour with the band, while its interior photographs were taken when on tour as a member of Kurt Vile & the Violators in October 2009, in Livingston, Montana.

Reception

Upon release, Slave Ambient received positive reviews from music critics. At Metacritic, which assigns a normalized rating out of 100 to reviews from mainstream critics, the album received an average of 82, based on 31 reviews, which indicates "universal acclaim".

Stuart Berman of Pitchfork gave the album a positive review, writing "The really amazing thing about the album is how anthemic and affirming it feels despite the near total absence of proper sing-along choruses." The album also received a "Best New Music" designation from the site. The A.V. Clubs Steven Hyden also gave the album a positive review, writing "With Adam Granduciel’s Dylan-esque drawl and a small orchestra of shimmering, vaguely noodly guitars as the group’s sonic trademarks, The War On Drugs is an unabashed trad-rock outfit. But Slave Ambient doesn’t recall the past so much as a bright, unexpected future, where bands like this inexplicably are still dreaming in new, refreshingly outsized ways." BBC's Lou Thomas called the songs on the album "memorable," concluding his review with "Slave Ambient as a whole may be more confused than your average reality show star at a Mensa meeting, but it’s full of decent songs with a lot of heart."

In a more mixed review, Slant Magazines Matthew Cole wrote "Too often, ambient passages like 'The Animator' and 'City Reprise' sound too obviously like interludes intended to fill space between real songs, rather than finished compositions in their own right." However, Cole concluded his review with: "...War on Drugs is a well-studied rock crew with an honest experimental streak, unfazed by the fact that relatively few of their potential fans will count Nebraska and Daydream Nation among their favorite records. But with a little more time to perfect their style, the War on Drugs would be well-positioned to win converts for both camps, and also their own." In another mixed review, Nows Richard Trapunski wrote: "It’s easy to get lost in the pleasant, euphoric drone, but at 47 minutes the album is more of a marathon than a sprint." Spin gave the album a score of 7/10, writing, "Main man Adam Granduciel gets plenty of Dylan comparisons, but Slave Ambient feels like a more back-alley Byrds filtered through a gauzier Spacemen 3 lens."

AccoladesSlave Ambient has appeared on several end-of-year lists. Paste ranked the album #37 on its list of the best 50 albums of 2011, writing "Even with the departure of Kurt Vile [...] their post-Vile songs have kept them steady, and, as proven by the almost defiantly solid Slave Ambient, they can be memorable and engaging all by themselves."  Uncut placed Slave Ambient at number 10 on its list, while Mojo ranked the album #21 on its end-of-year list.MOJO's Top 50 Albums Of 2011. Stereogum. 2 December 2011. Retrieved 11 December 2011. Pitchfork ranked the album #39 on its list of the Top 50 Albums of 2011.

 Track listing 
All songs written by Adam Granduciel, except where noted.

Personnel
The following people contributed to Slave Ambient:

The War on Drugs
 Adam Granduciel – lead vocals, electric guitars , acoustic guitars , animator guitars , harmonica , Siel OR400 , samplers , organ , harmonizer , tapes , cassettes , ARP Omni , bass guitar , keyboards , Tom Thumb piano , Farfisa , Korg Mono/Poly , Eventide , Moogerfooger , Voyager , synthesizer , percussion , drum machine , filters , dubs , drums 
 Dave Hartley – bass guitar , electric guitar , Nashville guitar , twelve-string guitar , Voyager , Roland Juno-60 , drums , electric autoharp  
 Robbie Bennett – piano , acoustic guitar , ARP Omni II , percussion 
 Mike Zanghi – drums , percussion , Hayman , Mu-Tron Bi-Phase 

Additional musicians
Kurt Vile – electric guitar 
 Steven Urgo – drums 
Jeff Zeigler – drum programming , harmonizers , patch bay , SPX90  
Michael Johnson – Eventide , modular Moog treatments , hamonizer settings , drums 
Jeff Ryan – drums 
Chad Stockslager – upright piano 
Jesse Trbovich – saxophone 
Kim Roney – piano 
John Ashley – Voyager 

Recording
Adam Granduciel – production, recording
Jeff Zeigler – production, recording
John Ashley – recording
Michael Johnson – additional engineering
John Congleton – additional engineering
Dave Hartley – additional engineering
Brian McTear – mixing 

Artwork
Adam Granduciel – photography
Daniel Murphy – design

Charts

References

External links
 Secretly Canadian's page on Slave Ambient
 Progress Report: The War On Drugs. Stereogum interview on the recording of Slave Ambient.''

Secretly Canadian albums
2011 albums
The War on Drugs (band) albums
Albums produced by Adam Granduciel